The 1972–73 season of the European Cup football club tournament was won for the third consecutive time by Ajax in the final against Juventus at Red Star Stadium in Belgrade. The win by Ajax resulted in the fourth consecutive championship by a Dutch team. Since Ajax had won the cup for a third time, they got to keep the full size copy of the cup. Because the reigning European champions were also champions of their own league, and neither Albania nor Northern Ireland sent their champions, the number of participating clubs dropped from 33 to 30.

Bracket

First round

|}

First leg

Second leg

The game was annulled because the referee ended the shoot-out prematurely after Panathinaikos fourth penalty was saved by Bulgarian goalkeeper. Panathinaikos complained to UEFA and the match was annulled and replayed the following month.

CSKA Sofia won 4–1 on aggregate.

Bayern Munich won 7–1 on aggregate.

Omonia won 3–2 on aggregate.

Dynamo Kyiv won 3–0 on aggregate.

Górnik Zabrze won 10–0 on aggregate.

Argeș Pitești won 6–0 on aggregate.

Real Madrid won 4–0 on aggregate.

Juventus won 3–1 on aggregate.

Magdeburg won 9–1 on aggregate.

Celtic won 5–2 on aggregate.

Újpesti Dózsa won 4–3 on aggregate.

Anderlecht won 7–2 on aggregate.

Derby County won 4–1 on aggregate.

Benfica won 4–2 on aggregate.

Second round

|}

First leg

Second leg

Ajax won 6–1 on aggregate.

Bayern Munich won 13–0 on aggregate.

Dynamo Kyiv won 3–2 on aggregate.

Real Madrid won 4–3 on aggregate.

Juventus won 2–0 on aggregate.

Újpesti Dózsa won 4–2 on aggregate.

Spartak Trnava won 2–0 on aggregate.

Derby County won 3–0 on aggregate.

Quarter-finals

|}

First leg

Second leg

Ajax won 5–2 on aggregate.

Real Madrid won 3–0 on aggregate.

2–2 on aggregate; Juventus won on away goals.

Derby County won 2–1 on aggregate.

Semi-finals

|}

First leg

Second leg

Ajax won 3–1 on aggregate.

Juventus won 3–1 on aggregate.

Final

Top scorers

Notes

References

External links
1972–73 All matches – season at UEFA website
European Cup results; at rsssf
 All scorers 1972–73 European Cup according to protocols UEFA
 All attendances 1972–73 European Cup according to protocols UEFA through UEFA match database
1972-73 European Cup - results and line-ups (archive)

1972–73 in European football
European Champion Clubs' Cup seasons